Ranthony Texada II (born May 16, 1995) is a professional American football defensive back for the San Antonio Brahmas of the XFL. He has also been a member of the Washington Redskins (NFL), New York Guardians (XFL), Winnipeg Blue Bombers (CFL), Ottawa Redblacks (CFL), and Montreal Alouettes (CFL).

College career
After using a redshirt season in 2013, Texada played college football for the TCU Horned Frogs from 2014 to 2017. He started in 42 games with the team where he had 117 tackles, 30 pass breakups, three interceptions, and five sacks.

Professional career

Washington Redskins
Texada signed as an undrafted free agent with the Washington Redskins in 2018, but was released with the final cuts at the conclusion of training camp on September 1, 2018.

Ottawa Redblacks
On November 22, 2018, Texada signed a futures contract with the Ottawa Redblacks for the 2019 season. Following 2019 training camp, he was signed to the team's practice roster on June 8, 2019, but was released one month later on July 8, 2019.

New York Guardians
Texada was drafted in the 10th round, 79th overall, by the New York Guardians in the 2020 XFL Draft. He played in five games and recorded 16 tackles and one sack before the league suspended operations and his contract was terminated on April 10, 2020.

Winnipeg Blue Bombers
On May 4, 2020, Texada signed with the Winnipeg Blue Bombers, but did not play for the team as the Canadian Football League cancelled the 2020 CFL season. He announced that he was opting out of his contract to pursue other playing opportunities on August 25, 2020. He opted back into his contract on January 25, 2021. However, Texada was released during training camp on July 26, 2021.

Ottawa Redblacks (II)
On August 31, 2021, Texada signed with the Ottawa Redblacks and was soon after placed on the team's practice roster. He later played in his first CFL game on October 29, 2021, against the Calgary Stampeders. He played in three regular season games where he had 11 defensive tackles.

In 2022, Texada began the season on the practice roster, but became a starter by the third game of the season following an injury to Abdul Kanneh. He recorded his first career interception in the Labour Day Classic, on September 2, 2022, against the Montreal Alouettes after picking off Trevor Harris. However, he was released shortly after this game on September 7, 2022.

Montreal Alouettes
On September 17, 2022, it was announced that Texada had signed with the Montreal Alouettes.

San Antonio Brahmas
The San Antonio Brahmas selected Texada in the 12th round of the 2023 XFL Supplemental Draft on January 1, 2023.

Personal life

Texada and his wife, Charli, have one daughter, Rayla. Texada was born to Nerissa and Ranthony Texada Sr. and he has two younger brothers, Raleigh and Ridge, who also play football as defensive backs. Texada played on the same youth baseball team as his future Redblacks teammate, Monshadrik Hunter.

References

External links
Montreal Alouettes bio

1995 births
Living people
American football defensive backs
Canadian football defensive backs
Montreal Alouettes players
New York Guardians players
Ottawa Redblacks players
Players of American football from Texas
People from Frisco, Texas
San Antonio Brahmas players
TCU Horned Frogs football players
Washington Redskins players
Winnipeg Blue Bombers players